Montecito Apartments is a large apartment building in Hollywood, California, USA.  It was built in 1935 in the zig-zag Art Deco style and was the home for many Hollywood celebrities, including James Cagney, Mickey Rooney, Percy Kilbride, and Montgomery Clift.  It was also Ronald Reagan’s first home when he moved to Hollywood in 1937.  In 1985, the building was converted to a low-income housing project for senior citizens.

Early years
The building was built in 1935 with 95 units at a cost of $1 million.  Set on a  hill overlooking the city, the Montecito is the highest building in Hollywood.  It has a private swimming pool, two subterranean garages and a parking lot.  The building is a classic Art Deco design with Mayan influences and windows arranged in vertical blinds.  In 1946, it was sold for $600,000.  In 1954, it was sold again, this time by Isadore and Libby Teacher to Howard Fox and Harry Wyatt.

Home for Ronald Reagan and other actors

The Montecito was home to several future movie stars, especially New York based actors while working in Hollywood.  It was Ronald Reagan’s first residence when he moved to Hollywood; Reagan lived at the Montecito from June 1937 to late 1938.  Reagan was said to have been roommates at the Montecito with Mickey Rooney.  Other celebrities who have lived at the Montecito include James Cagney, George C. Scott, Montgomery Clift, Geraldine Page, Don Johnson, Sal Mineo, and Ben Vereen. The Montecito was the subject of a two-part TV Guide profile written by Richard Gehman. It referenced many of its familiar character actor residents including Maurice Gosfield.

Renovation and conversion to senior housing

In 1970, rents ranged from $180 to $400 for furnished apartments.
In 1984, the owners obtained grants and loans from the Los Angeles Community Redevelopment Agency (“CRA”) and HUD to rehabilitate the building and convert it into 180 apartments for low income senior citizens.  In 1988, the Los Angeles Conservancy presented an award to the Montecito for the redevelopment project.

In 1995, the owners defaulted on loans, and Bank of America foreclosed on the building. The foreclosure triggered CRA losses that amount to $8.2 million.

Historic designation
In 1985, the building was listed on the National Register of Historic Places.  The Montecito has been described as “one of the finest examples of the Art Deco style, with Mayan influence detailing.”  It is also significant for its architectural quality and integrity and as the finest extant work of architect Marcus P. Miller.

See also
 List of Registered Historic Places in Los Angeles

References

Residential buildings on the National Register of Historic Places in Los Angeles
Residential buildings completed in 1935
Residential skyscrapers in Los Angeles
Apartment buildings in Los Angeles
Culture of Hollywood, Los Angeles
Art Deco architecture in California
Buildings and structures in Hollywood, Los Angeles